The Indian softshell turtle (Nilssonia gangetica), or Ganges softshell turtle is a species of softshell turtle found in South Asia in rivers such as the Ganges, Indus and Mahanadi. It feeds mostly on fish, amphibians, carrion and other animal matter, but also takes aquatic plants. This turtle is listed in part II of Schedule I of the Wild Life (Protection) Act, 1972 and possession of this species is an offence.

Description
The species is identified on the basis of the structure of the carapace and plastron. There are eight pairs of costal plates, the last well developed and in contact throughout on the median line; two neurals between the first pair of costals; plates coarsely pitted and vermiculate. Epiplastra narrowly separated from each other in front of the ontoplastron, which forms an obtuse or a right angle; plastral callosities very large, hyo-hypoplastral, xiphiplastral, and, in old specimens, ento-plastral. Dorsal skin of young with longitudinal ridges of small tubercles. Head moderate; snout (on the skull) about as long as the diameter of the orbit; interorbital region, in the adult, considerably narrower than the nasal fossa; postorbital arch one third to one half the greatest diameter of the orbit; mandible with the inner edge strongly raised, forming a sharp ridge, which sends off a short perpendicular process at the symphysis; the diameter of the mandible at the symphysis does not exceed the diameter of the orbit. Olive above; back of young vermiculated with fine black lines, but without ocelli; head with a black longitudinal streak from between the eyes to the nape, intersected by two or three inverted-V shaped black streaks; lower parts yellowish.
Length of dorsal disk 2 feet.

Distribution
This species is found to occur in the Indus, Ganges/Padma, Meghna, Brahmaputra, Jamuna, Narmada and Mahanadi basins and most of their tributaries and intervening drainages and in the countries of Afghanistan, Bangladesh, India (Assam, Bihar, Gujarat, Jammu & Kashmir, Madhya Pradesh, Orissa, Punjab, Rajasthan, Uttar Pradesh and West Bengal), Southern Nepal and Pakistan.

In culture
These turtles are often maintained in the temple ponds of Orissa where they are considered sacred.

Gallery

See also

Indian flapshell turtle

References

 Anderson,J. 1872 Note on Trionyx gangeticus, and Trionyx hurum, B. Hamilton. Ann. Mag. Nat. Hist. (4) 9: 382–383
 Anderson,J. 1872 On Trionyx gangeticus, Cuvier, Trionyx hurum, B.H. and Dr. Gray. Ann. Mag. Nat. Hist. (4) 10: 219–222
 Cuvier, G.L.C.F.D. 1825 Recherches sur les ossemens fossiles de quadrupèdes, où l'on rétablit les caractères du plusieurs espèces d'animaux que les révolutions du globe paroissent avoir détruites. Dufour & d'Ocagne, Paris. ed. 3, 5 vols. (Parts of this 5 volume edition are cited as appearing from 1821 to 1824; volume 5 appeared in 1825. It consists mostly of articles reprinted from Annales du Muséum d'Histoire Naturelle, Paris. See also Cuvier 1812.)
 Webb, R.G. 2004 Trionychid turtle miscellany. Hamadryad 28 (1&2): 119–121

External links
 

Nilssonia (turtle)
Reptiles of South Asia
Reptiles of India
Reptiles described in 1825
Taxa named by Georges Cuvier